The United States Coast Guard (USCG) is the maritime security, search and rescue, and law enforcement service branch of the United States Armed Forces and one of the country's eight uniformed services. The service is a maritime, military, multi-mission service unique among the United States military branches for having a maritime law enforcement mission with jurisdiction in both domestic and international waters and a federal regulatory agency mission as part of its duties. It is the largest and most powerful coast guard in the world, rivaling the capabilities and size of most navies.

The U.S. Coast Guard is a humanitarian and security service. It protects the United States' borders and economic and security interests abroad; and defends its sovereignty by safeguarding sea lines of communication and commerce across vast territorial waters spanning 95,000 miles of coastline and its Exclusive Economic Zone. With national and economic security depending upon open global trade and a rules-based international order, and with ever-expanding risk imposed by transnational threats through the maritime and cyber domains, the U.S. Coast Guard is at any given time deployed to and operating on all seven continents and in cyberspace to save lives; enforce laws; ensure safe and secure commerce; and protect the environment. Like its United States Navy sibling, the U.S. Coast Guard maintains a global presence with permanently-assigned personnel throughout the world and forces routinely deploying to both littoral and blue-water regions. The rise of great power competition and adversarial challenges to rules-based international order through inter-state aggression, economic coercion, and maritime hybrid warfare has cultivated numerous conflict hotspots around the world. The U.S. Coast Guard's adaptive, multi-mission "white hull" fleet is leveraged as a force of both diplomatic soft power and humanitarian and security assistance over the more overtly confrontational nature of "gray hulled" warships. As a humanitarian service, it saves tens of thousands of lives a year at sea and in U.S. waters, and provides emergency response and disaster management for a wide range of man-made and natural catastrophic incidents in the U.S. and throughout the world.

The U.S. Coast Guard operates under the U.S. Department of Homeland Security during peacetime. During times of war, it can be transferred in whole or in part to the U.S. Department of the Navy under the Department of Defense by order of the U.S. President or by act of Congress. Prior to its transfer to Homeland Security, it operated under the Department of Transportation from 1967 to 2003 and the Department of the Treasury from its inception until 1967. A congressional authority transfer to the Navy has only happened once: in 1917, during World War I. By the time the U.S. entered World War II in December 1941, the U.S. Coast Guard had already been transferred to the Navy by President Franklin Roosevelt.

Created by Congress as the Revenue-Marine on 4 August 1790 at the request of Alexander Hamilton, it is the oldest continuously operating naval service of the United States. As Secretary of the Treasury, Hamilton headed the Revenue-Marine, whose original purpose was collecting customs duties at U.S. seaports. By the 1860s, the service was known as the U.S. Revenue Cutter Service and the term Revenue-Marine gradually fell into disuse.

The modern U.S. Coast Guard was formed by a merger of the U.S. Revenue Cutter Service and the U.S. Life-Saving Service on 28 January 1915, under the Department of the Treasury. In 1939, the U.S. Lighthouse Service was also merged into the U.S. Coast Guard. As one of the country's six armed services, the U.S. Coast Guard has deployed to support and fight every major U.S. war since 1790, from the Quasi-War with France to the Global War on Terrorism.

As of December 2021, the U.S. Coast Guard's authorized force strength is 44,500 active duty personnel and 7,000 reservists .  The service's force strength also includes 8,577 full-time civilian federal employees and 31,000 uniformed volunteers of the U.S. Coast Guard Auxiliary. The service maintains an extensive fleet of roughly 250 coastal and ocean-going cutters, patrol ships, buoy tenders, tugs, and icebreakers; as well as nearly 2,000 small boats and specialized craft. It also maintains an aviation division consisting of more than 200 helicopters and fixed-wing aircraft. While the U.S. Coast Guard is the second smallest of the U.S. military service branches in terms of membership, the service by itself is the world's 12th largest naval force.

Mission

Role
The Coast Guard carries out three basic roles, which are further subdivided into eleven statutory missions. The three roles are:
 Maritime safety
 Maritime security
 Maritime stewardship

With a decentralized organization and much responsibility placed on even the most junior personnel, the Coast Guard is frequently lauded for its quick responsiveness and adaptability in a broad range of emergencies. In a 2005 article in Time magazine following Hurricane Katrina, the author wrote, "the Coast Guard's most valuable contribution to [a military effort when catastrophe hits] may be as a model of flexibility, and most of all, spirit." Wil Milam, a rescue swimmer from Alaska told the magazine, "In the Navy, it was all about the mission. Practicing for war, training for war. In the Coast Guard, it was, take care of our people and the mission will take care of itself."

Missions

The eleven statutory missions as defined by law are divided into homeland security missions and non-homeland security missions:

Non-homeland security missions
 Ice operations, including the International Ice Patrol
 Living marine resources (fisheries law enforcement)
 Marine environmental protection
 Marine safety
 Aids to navigation
 Search and rescue

Homeland security missions
 Defense readiness
 Maritime law enforcement
 Migrant interdiction
 Ports, waterways and coastal security (PWCS)
 Drug interdiction

Search and rescue

The U.S. Coast Guard Search and Rescue (CG-SAR) is one of the Coast Guard's best-known operations.  The National Search and Rescue Plan designates the Coast Guard as the federal agency responsible for maritime SAR operations, and the United States Air Force as the federal agency responsible for inland SAR. Both agencies maintain rescue coordination centers to coordinate this effort, and have responsibility for both military and civilian search and rescue. The two services jointly provide instructor staff for the National Search and Rescue School that trains SAR mission planners and coordinators. Previously located on Governors Island, New York, the school is now located at Coast Guard Training Center Yorktown at Yorktown, Virginia.

National Response Center

Operated by the Coast Guard, the National Response Center (NRC) is the sole U.S. Government point of contact for reporting all oil, chemical, radiological, biological, and etiological spills and discharges into the environment, anywhere in the United States and its territories. In addition to gathering and distributing spill/incident information for Federal On Scene Coordinators and serving as the communications and operations center for the National Response Team, the NRC maintains agreements with a variety of federal entities to make additional notifications regarding incidents meeting established trigger criteria. The NRC also takes Maritime Suspicious Activity and Security Breach Reports. Details on the NRC organization and specific responsibilities can be found in the National Oil and Hazardous Substances Pollution Contingency Plan. The Marine Information for Safety and Law Enforcement (MISLE) database system is managed and used by the Coast Guard for tracking pollution and safety incidents in the nation's ports.

National Maritime Center
The National Maritime Center (NMC) is the merchant mariner credentialing authority for the USCG under the auspices of the Department of Homeland Security. To ensure a safe, secure, and environmentally sound marine transportation system, the mission of the NMC is to issue credentials to fully qualified mariners in the United States maritime jurisdiction.

Authority as an armed service

The six uniformed services that make up the U.S. Armed Forces are defined in Title 10 of the U.S. Code:

The Coast Guard is further defined by Title 14 of the United States Code:

Coast Guard organization and operation is as set forth in Title 33 of the Code of Federal Regulations.

On 25 November 2002, the Homeland Security Act was signed into law by U.S. President George W. Bush, designating the Coast Guard to be placed under the U.S. Department of Homeland Security. The transfer of administrative control from the U.S. Department of Transportation to the U.S. Department of Homeland Security was completed the following year, on 1 March 2003.

The U.S. Coast Guard reports directly to the civilian Secretary of Homeland Security. However, under  as amended by section 211 of the Coast Guard and Maritime Transportation Act of 2006, upon the declaration of war and when Congress so directs in the declaration, or when the President directs, the Coast Guard operates under the Department of Defense as a service in the Department of the Navy.

As members of the military, Coast Guardsmen on active and reserve service are subject to the Uniform Code of Military Justice and receive the same pay and allowances as members of the same pay grades in the other uniformed services.

The service has participated in every major U.S. conflict from 1790 through today, including landing troops on D-Day and on the Pacific Islands in World War II, in extensive patrols and shore bombardment during the Vietnam War, and multiple roles in Operation Iraqi Freedom. Maritime interception operations, coastal security, transportation security, and law enforcement detachments have been its major roles in recent conflicts in Iraq.

On 17 October 2007, the Coast Guard joined with the U.S. Navy and U.S. Marine Corps to adopt a new maritime strategy called A Cooperative Strategy for 21st Century Seapower that raised the notion of prevention of war to the same philosophical level as the conduct of war. This new strategy charted a course for the Navy, Coast Guard and Marine Corps to work collectively with each other and international partners to prevent regional crises, man-made or natural, from occurring, or reacting quickly should one occur to avoid negative impacts to the United States. During the launch of the new U.S. maritime strategy at the International Seapower Symposium at the U.S. Naval War College in 2007, Coast Guard Commandant Admiral Thad Allen said the new maritime strategy reinforced the time-honored missions the service has carried out in the United States since 1790. "It reinforces the Coast Guard maritime strategy of safety, security and stewardship, and it reflects not only the global reach of our maritime services but the need to integrate and synchronize and act with our coalition and international partners to not only win wars ... but to prevent wars," Allen said.

Authority as a law enforcement agency
Title 14 USC, section 2 authorizes the Coast Guard to enforce U.S. federal laws.

This places them under , which grants customs officers general federal law enforcement authority, including the authority to:

The U.S. Government Accountability Office Report to the House of Representatives, Committee on the Judiciary on its 2006 Survey of Federal Civilian Law Enforcement Functions and Authorities, identified the Coast Guard as one of 104 federal components that employed law enforcement officers. The report also included a summary table of the authorities of the Coast Guard's 192 special agents and 3,780 maritime law enforcement boarding officers.

Coast Guardsmen have the legal authority to carry their service-issued firearms on and off base. This is rarely done in practice, however; at many Coast Guard stations, commanders prefer to have all service-issued weapons in armories when not in use. Still, one court has held in the case of People v. Booth that Coast Guard boarding officers are qualified law enforcement officers authorized to carry personal firearms off-duty for self-defense.

History

The Coast Guard traced its roots to the small fleet of vessels maintained by the United States Department of the Treasury beginning in the 1790s to enforce tariffs (an important source of revenue for the new nation). Secretary of the Treasury Alexander Hamilton lobbied Congress to fund the construction of ten cutters, which it did on 4 August 1790 (now celebrated as the Coast Guard's official birthday). Until the re-establishment of the Navy in 1798, these "revenue cutters" were the only naval force of the early United States. As such, the cutters and their crews frequently took on additional duties, including combating piracy, rescuing mariners in distress, ferrying government officials, and even carrying mail. Initially not an organized federal agency at all, merely a "system of cutters," each ship operated under the direction of the customs officials in the port to which it was assigned. Several names, including "Revenue-Marine," were used as the service gradually becoming more organized. Eventually it was officially organized as the United States Revenue Cutter Service. In addition to its regular law enforcement and customs duties, revenue cutters and their crews were used to support and supplement the Navy in various armed conflicts including the American Civil War.

A separate federal agency, the U.S. Life-Saving Service, developed alongside the Revenue-Marine.  Prior to 1848, there were various charitable efforts at creating systems to provide assistance to shipwrecked mariners from shore-based stations, notably by the Massachusetts Humane Society. The federal government began funding lifesaving stations in 1848 but funding was inconsistent and the system still relied on all-volunteer crews. In 1871, Sumner Increase Kimball was appointed chief of the Treasury Department's newly-created Revenue Marine Division, and began the process of organizing the Revenue-Marine cutters into a centralized agency. Kimball also pushed for more funding lifesaving stations and eventually secured approval to create the Lifesaving Service as a separate federal agency, also within the Treasury Department, with fulltime paid crews.

In 1915 these two agencies, the Revenue Cutter Service and the Lifesaving Service, were merged to create the modern United States Coast Guard. The Lighthouse Service and the Bureau of Marine Inspection and Navigation were absorbed by the Coast Guard 1939 and 1942 respectively.
In 1967, the Coast Guard moved from the U.S. Department of the Treasury to the newly formed U.S. Department of Transportation, an arrangement that lasted until it was placed under the U.S. Department of Homeland Security in 2003 as part of legislation designed to more efficiently protect American interests following the terrorist attacks of 11 September 2001.

In times of war, the Coast Guard or individual components of it can operate as a service of the Department of the Navy. This arrangement has a broad historical basis, as the Coast Guard has been involved in wars as diverse as the War of 1812, the Mexican–American War, and the American Civil War, in which the cutter Harriet Lane fired the first naval shots attempting to relieve besieged Fort Sumter. The last time the Coast Guard operated as a whole within the Navy was in World War II, in all some 250,000 served in the Coast Guard during World War II.

Coast Guard Squadron One, was a combat unit formed by the United States Coast Guard in 1965 for service during the Vietnam War. Placed under the operational control of the United States Navy, it was assigned duties in Operation Market Time. Its formation marked the first time since World War II that Coast Guard personnel were used extensively in a combat environment. The squadron operated divisions in three separate areas during the period of 1965 to 1970. Twenty-six Point-class cutters with their crews and a squadron support staff were assigned to the U.S. Navy with the mission of interdicting the movement of arms and supplies from the South China Sea into South Vietnam by Viet Cong and North Vietnam junk and trawler operators. The squadron also provided 81mm mortar naval gunfire support to nearby friendly units operating along the South Vietnamese coastline and assisted the U.S. Navy during Operation Sealords.

Coast Guard Squadron Three, was a combat unit formed by the United States Coast Guard in 1967 for service during the Vietnam War. Placed under the operational control of the United States Navy and based in Pearl Harbor. It consisted of five USCG High Endurance Cutters operating on revolving six-month deployments. A total of 35 High Endurance Cutters took part in operations from May 1967 to December 1971, most notably using their 5-inch guns to provide naval gunfire support missions.

Often units within the Coast Guard operate under Department of the Navy operational control while other Coast Guard units remain under the Department of Homeland Security.

Deployable Operations Group

The Deployable Operations Group (DOG) was a Coast Guard command established in July 2007. The DOG established a single command authority to rapidly provide the Coast Guard, Department of Homeland Security, Department of Defense, Department of Justice and other interagency operational commanders adaptive force packages drawn from the Coast Guard's deployable specialized force units. The DOG was disestablished on 22 April 2013 and its deployable specialized forces (DSF) units were placed under the control of the Atlantic and Pacific Area Commanders.

The planning for the unit began after the terrorist attacks of 11 September 2001, and culminated with its formation on 20 July 2007. Its missions included maritime law enforcement, anti-terrorism, port security, pollution response, and diving operations.

There were over 25 specialized units within the Deployable Operations Group including the Maritime Security Response Team, Maritime Safety and Security Teams, Law Enforcement Detachments, Port Security Units, the National Strike Force, and Regional Dive Lockers. The DOG also managed Coast Guard personnel assigned to the Navy Expeditionary Combat Command and was involved in the selection of Coast Guard candidates to attend Navy BUD/S and serve with Navy SEAL Teams.

Images

Organization

The new Department of Homeland Security headquarters complex is on the grounds of the former St. Elizabeths Hospital in the Anacostia section of Southeast Washington, across the Anacostia River from former Coast Guard headquarters.

The fiscal year 2016 budget request for the U.S. Coast Guard was $9.96 billion.

Districts and units

The Coast Guard's current district organization is divided into 9 districts. Their designations, district office and area of responsibility are as follows:

Shore establishments

Shore establishment commands exist to support and facilitate the mission of the sea and air assets and Coastal Defense. U.S. Coast Guard Headquarters is located in Southeast Washington, DC. Examples of other shore establishment types are Coast Guard Sectors (which may include Coast Guard Bases), Surface Forces Logistics Center (SFLC), Coast Guard Stations, Coast Guard Air Stations, and the United States Coast Guard Yard. Training centers are included in the shore establishment commands. The military college for the USCG is called the United States Coast Guard Academy which trains both new officers through a four year program and enlisted personnel joining the ranks of officers through a 17 week program called Officer Candidate School (OCS).  Abbreviated TRACEN, the other Training Centers include Training Center Cape May for enlisted bootcamp, Training Center Petaluma and Training Center Yorktown for enlisted "A" schools and "C" schools, and Coast Guard Aviation Technical Training Center and Coast Guard Aviation Training Center Mobile for aviation enlisted "A" school, "C" schools, and pilot officer training.

Personnel
The Coast Guard has a total workforce of 87,569. The formal name for a uniformed member of the Coast Guard is "Coast Guardsman", irrespective of gender. "Coastie" is an informal term commonly used to refer to current or former Coast Guard personnel. In 2008, the term "Guardian" was introduced as an alternative but was later dropped. Admiral Robert J. Papp Jr. stated that it was his belief that no Commandant had the authority to change what members of the Coast Guard are called as the term Coast Guardsman is found in Title 14 USC which established the Coast Guard in 1915. "Team Coast Guard" refers to the four components of the Coast Guard as a whole: Regular, Reserve, Auxiliary, and Coast Guard civilian employees.

Commissioned officers
Commissioned officers in the Coast Guard hold pay grades ranging from O-1 to O-10 and have the same rank structure as the Navy. Officers holding the rank of ensign (O-1) through lieutenant commander (O-4) are considered junior officers, commanders (O-5) and captains (O-6) are considered senior officers, and rear admirals (O-7) through admirals (O-10) are considered flag officers. The Commandant of the Coast Guard and the Vice Commandant of the Coast Guard are the only members of the Coast Guard authorized to hold the rank of admiral.

The Coast Guard does not have medical officers or chaplains of its own. Instead, chaplains from the U.S. Navy, as well as officers from the U.S. Public Health Service Commissioned Corps are assigned to the Coast Guard to perform chaplain-related functions and medical-related functions, respectively. These officers wear Coast Guard uniforms but replace the Coast Guard insignia with that of their own service.

The Navy and Coast Guard share identical officer rank insignia except that Coast Guard officers wear a gold Coast Guard Shield in lieu of a line star or staff corps officer insignia.

Warrant officers

Highly qualified enlisted personnel in pay grades E-6 through E-9 with a minimum of eight years' experience can compete each year for appointment as warrant officers (WO). Successful candidates are chosen by a board and then commissioned as chief warrant officer two (CWO2) in one of twenty-one specialties. Over time, chief warrant officers may be promoted to chief warrant officer three (CWO3) and chief warrant officer four (CWO4). The ranks of warrant officer (WO1) and chief warrant officer five (CWO5) are not currently used in the Coast Guard. Chief warrant officers may also compete for the Chief Warrant Officer to Lieutenant Program. If selected, the warrant officer will be promoted to lieutenant (O-3E). The "E" designates over four years' active duty service as a warrant officer or enlisted member and entitles the member to a higher rate of pay than other lieutenants.

Enlisted personnel

Enlisted members of the Coast Guard have pay grades from E-1 to E-9 and also follow the same rank structure as the Navy. Enlisted members in pay grades of E-4 and higher are considered petty officers and follow career development paths very similar to those of Navy petty officers.

Petty officers in pay grade E-7 and higher are chief petty officers and must attend the Coast Guard Chief Petty Officer Academy, or an equivalent Department of Defense school, in order to be advanced to pay grade E-8. The basic themes of the school are:
 Professionalism
 Leadership
 Communications
 Systems thinking and lifelong learning

Enlisted rank insignia is also nearly identical to Navy enlisted insignia. The Coast Guard shield replacing the petty officer's eagle on collar and cap devices for petty officers or enlisted rating insignia for seamen qualified as a "designated striker". Group Rate marks (stripes) for junior enlisted members (E-3 and below) also follow Navy convention with white for seaman, red for fireman, and green for airman. In a departure from the Navy conventions, all petty officers E-6 and below wear red chevrons and all chief petty officers wear gold.

Training

Officer training
The U.S. Coast Guard Academy is a four-year service academy located in New London, Connecticut. Approximately 200 cadets graduate each year, receiving a Bachelor of Science degree and a commission as an ensign in the Coast Guard. Graduates are obligated to serve a minimum of five years on active duty. Most graduates are assigned to duty aboard Coast Guard cutters immediately after graduation, either as Deck Watch Officers (DWOs) or as Engineer Officers in Training (EOITs). Smaller numbers are assigned directly to flight training at Naval Air Station Pensacola, Florida or to shore duty at Coast Guard Sector, District, or Area headquarters units.

In addition to the Academy, prospective officers, who already hold a college degree, may enter the Coast Guard through Officer Candidate School (OCS), also located at the Coast Guard Academy. OCS is a 17-week course of instruction that prepares candidates to serve effectively as officers in the Coast Guard. In addition to indoctrinating students into a military lifestyle, OCS provides a wide range of highly technical information necessary to perform the duties of a Coast Guard officer.

Graduates of OCS are usually commissioned as ensigns, but some with advanced graduate degrees may enter as lieutenants (junior grade) or lieutenants. Graduating OCS officers entering active duty are required to serve a minimum of three years, while graduating reserve officers are required to serve four years. Graduates may be assigned to a cutter, flight training, a staff job, or an operations ashore billet. OCS is the primary channel through which the Coast Guard enlisted grades ascend to the commissioned officer corps. Unlike the other military services, the Coast Guard does not have a Reserve Officers' Training Corps (ROTC) program.

Lawyers, engineers, intelligence officers, military aviators holding commissions in other branches of the U.S. Armed Forces requesting interservice transfers to the Coast Guard, graduates of maritime academies, and certain other individuals may also receive an officer's commission in the Coast Guard through the Direct Commission Officer (DCO) program. Depending on the specific program and the background of the individual, the course is three, four or five weeks long. The first week of the five-week course is an indoctrination week. The DCO program is designed to commission officers with highly specialized professional training or certain kinds of previous military experience.

Recruit training

Newly enlisted personnel are sent to eight weeks of recruit training at Coast Guard Training Center Cape May in Cape May, New Jersey. New recruits arrive at Sexton Hall and remain there for three days of initial processing which includes haircuts, vaccinations, uniform issue, and other necessary entrance procedures. During this initial processing period, the new recruits are led by temporary company commanders. These temporary company commanders are tasked with teaching the new recruits how to march and preparing them to enter into their designated company. The temporary company commanders typically do not enforce any physical activity such as push ups or crunches. When the initial processing is complete, the new seaman recruits are introduced to their permanent company commanders who will remain with them until the end of training. There is typically a designated lead company commander and two support company commanders. The balance of the eight-week boot camp is spent in learning teamwork and developing physical skills. An introduction of how the Coast Guard operates with special emphasis on the Coast Guard's core values is an important part of the training.

The current nine Recruit Training Objectives are:
 Self-discipline
 Military skills
 Marksmanship
 Vocational skills and academics
 Military bearing
 Physical fitness and wellness
 Water survival and swim qualifications
 Esprit de corps
 Core values (Honor, Respect, and Devotion to Duty)

Service schools
Following graduation from recruit training, most members are sent to their first unit while they await orders to attend advanced training in Class "A" Schools. At "A" schools, Coast Guard enlisted personnel are trained in their chosen rating; rating is a Coast Guard and Navy term for enlisted skills synonymous with the Army's and Marine Corps' military occupation codes (MOS) and Air Force's Air Force Specialty Code (AFSC). Members who earned high ASVAB scores or who were otherwise guaranteed an "A" School of choice while enlisting may go directly to their "A" School upon graduation from Boot Camp.

Civilian personnel
The Coast Guard employs over 8,577 civilians in over two hundred different job types including Coast Guard Investigative Service special agents, lawyers, engineers, technicians, administrative personnel, tradesmen, and federal firefighters. Civilian employees work at various levels in the Coast Guard to support its various missions.

Equipment

Cutters

 National Security Cutter (WMSL): Also known as the Legend-class, these are the Coast Guard's latest class of  cutter. At 418 ft. these are the largest USCG military cutters in active service. One-for-one, Legend-class ships have replaced individually decommissioned 1960s s, (also known as the High Endurance Cutter (WHEC)). A total of eleven were authorized and budgeted; as of 2021 eight are in service, and two are under construction. 

 Medium Endurance Cutter (WMEC): These are mostly the  Reliance-class, and the  Famous-class cutters, although the   also falls into this category. Primary missions are law enforcement, search and rescue, and military defense. Heritage-class cutters are expected to eventually replace the Reliance- and Famous-class cutters as they are completed.
  (WAGB): There are three WAGB's used for icebreaking and research though only two, the heavy   and the newer medium class  , are active.  is located in Seattle, Washington but is not currently in active service. The icebreakers are being replaced with new heavy icebreakers under the Polar icebreaker program, the world's largest coast guard vessel due for delivery in 2025.
 : A  sailing barque used as a training ship for Coast Guard Academy cadets and Coast Guard officer candidates. She was originally built in Germany as Horst Wessel, and was seized by the United States as a prize of war in 1945.
 : A  heavy icebreaker built for operations on the Great Lakes.
 Seagoing Buoy Tender (WLB): These  ships are used to maintain aids to navigation and also assist with law enforcement and search and rescue.
 Coastal Buoy Tender (WLM): The  Keeper-class coastal buoy tenders are used to maintain coastal aids to navigation.

  cutter (WPC): The  Sentinel-class, also known by its program name, the "Fast Response Cutter"-class and is used for search and rescue work and law enforcement.
  icebreaking tug (WTGB):  icebreakers used primarily for domestic icebreaking missions. Other missions include search and rescue, law enforcement, and aids to navigation maintenance.

 Patrol Boats (WPB): There are two classes of WPBs currently in service; the  s and the  s
 Small Harbor Tug (WYTL):  small icebreaking tugboats, used primary for ice clearing in domestic harbors in addition to limited search and rescue and law enforcement roles.

Boats

The Coast Guard boat fleet includes:
 Motor Lifeboat (MLB): The Coast Guard's  primary heavy-weather boat used for search and rescue as well as law enforcement and homeland security.
 Response Boat – Medium (RB-M): A new multi-mission  vessel intended to replace the  utility boat. 170 planned
 Special Purpose Craft – Near Shore Lifeboat: Only 2 built. Shallow draft,  lifeboat substituted for the  Motor Life Boat, based at Chatham, Massachusetts
Deployable Pursuit Boat (DPB): A  launch capable of pursuing fast cocaine smuggling craft.
 Aids to Navigation Boats (TANB/BUSL/ANB/ANB): Various designs ranging from  used to maintain aids to navigation.
 Special Purpose Craft – Law Enforcement (SPC-LE): Intended to operate in support of specialized law enforcement missions, utilizing three  Mercury Marine engines.
 Transportable Port Security Boat (TPSB): A  well-armed boat used by Port Security Units for force protection.
 SPC-SW Special Purpose Craft, Shallow-water: 
 Over-the-Horizon (OTH) boat: A  rigid hull inflatable boat used by medium and high endurance cutters and specialized units.
 Short Range Prosecutor (SRP): A  rigid hull inflatable boat that can be launched from a stern launching ramp on the National Security Cutters.

Aircraft

The Coast Guard operates approximately 201 fixed and rotary wing aircraft from 24 Coast Guard Air Stations throughout the contiguous United States, Alaska, Hawaii, and Puerto Rico. Most of these air stations are tenant activities at civilian airports, several of which are former Air Force Bases and Naval Air Stations, although several are also independent military facilities. Coast Guard Air Stations are also located on active Naval Air Stations, Air National Guard bases, and Army Air Fields.

Coast Guard aviators receive Primary (fixed-wing) and Advanced (fixed or rotary-wing) flight training with their Navy and Marine Corps counterparts at NAS Whiting Field, Florida, and NAS Corpus Christi, Texas, and are considered Naval Aviators. After receiving Naval Aviator Wings, Coast Guard pilots, with the exception of those slated to fly the HC-130, report to U.S. Coast Guard Aviation Training Center, Mobile, Alabama to receive 6–12 weeks of specialized training in the Coast Guard fleet aircraft they will operate. HC-130 pilots report to Little Rock AFB, Arkansas, for joint C-130 training under the auspices of the 314th Airlift Wing of the U.S. Air Force.

Fixed-wing aircraft operate from Air Stations on long-duration missions. Helicopters operate from Air Stations and can deploy on a number of different cutters. Helicopters can rescue people or intercept vessels smuggling migrants or narcotics. Since the terrorist attacks of 11 September 2001, the Coast Guard has developed a more prominent role in national security and now has armed helicopters operating in high-risk areas for the purpose of maritime law enforcement and anti-terrorism.

The Coast Guard is now developing an unmanned aerial vehicle (UAV) program that will utilize the MQ-9 Reaper platform for homeland security and search/rescue operations. To support this endeavor, the Coast Guard has partnered with the Navy and U.S. Customs and Border Protection to study existing/emerging unmanned aerial system (UAS) capabilities within their respective organizations. As these systems mature, research and operational experience gleaned from this joint effort will enable the Coast Guard to develop its own cutter and land-based UAS capabilities.

Current aircraft

|-
! Type
! Manufacturer
! Origin
! Class
! Role
! Introduced
! In service
! Notes
|-
| C-27J Spartan
|Alenia Aeronautica
| U.S.Italy
| Turboprop
| Search and rescue
| 2014
| 14
| Former Air Force aircraft, acquired in return for the release of seven HC-130H aircraft to the United States Forest Service for use as aerial tankers.
|-
| C-37A
|Gulfstream
| U.S.
| Jet
| Priority Airlift
| 1998
| 1
| Priority Airlift for high-ranking members of the Department of Homeland Security and U.S. Coast Guard.
|-
| C-37B
|Gulfstream
| U.S.
| Jet
| Priority Airlift
| 2017
| 1
| Priority Airlift for high-ranking members of the Department of Homeland Security and U.S. Coast Guard.
|-
| HC-130H Hercules
|Lockheed Martin
| U.S.
| Turboprop
| Search and rescue
| 1974
| 14
| Most have been removed from service and are being replaced by HC-130J aircraft. Seven were turned over to the United States Forest Service to be converted to aerial firefighting tankers.
|-
| HC-130J Hercules
|Lockheed Martin
| U.S.
| Turboprop
| Search and rescue
| 2003
| 12
| More on order, currently being manufactured to replace HC-130H.
|-
| HC-144A Ocean Sentry
|Airbus
| U.S.Spain
| Turboprop
| Search and rescue
| 2009
| 15
| 
|-
| HC-144B Minotaur
|Airbus
| U.S.Spain
| Turboprop
| Search and rescue
| 2016
| 3
| Minotaur upgrade of HC-144A aircraft includes advance navigation and search and rescue equipment.
|-
| MH-60T Jayhawk
|Sikorsky
| U.S.
| Helicopter
| Medium Range Recovery (MRR)
| 1990
| 42
| may remain in service until 2035
|- 
| MH-65D Dolphin
|Eurocopter
| U.S.France
| Helicopter
| Short Range Recovery (SRR)
| 1984
| 95
| 
|- 
| MH-65E Dolphin
|Eurocopter
| U.S.France
| Helicopter
| Short Range Recovery (SRR)
| 1984
| 3
| Upgraded version of MH-65D with advanced avionics and search and rescue equipment
|}

Weapons

Naval guns
Most Coast Guard Cutters have one or more naval gun systems installed, including:

The Oto Melara 76 mm, a radar-guided computer controlled gun system that is used on Medium Endurance Cutters. The 3-inch gun's high rate of fire and availability of specialized ammunition make it a multi-purpose gun capable of anti-shipping, anti-aircraft, ground support, and short-range anti-missile defense.
The MK 110 57mm gun, a radar-guided computer controlled variant of the Bofors 57 mm gun. It is used on the Legend-class cutter, also known as the National Security Cutter (NSC). It is a multi-purpose gun capable of anti-shipping, anti-aircraft, and short-range anti-missile defense. The stealth mount has a reduced radar profile. Also, the gun has a small radar mounted on the gun barrel to measure muzzle velocity for fire control purposes and can change ammunition types instantly due to a dual-feed system. It can also be operated/fired manually using a joystick and video camera (mounted on gun).
The Mk 38 Mod 0 weapons system consists of an M242 Bushmaster 25mm chain gun and the Mk 88 Mod 0 machine gun mount. A manned system, its gyro-stabilization compensates for the pitching deck. It provides ships with defensive and offensive gunfire capability for the engagement of a variety of surface targets. Designed primarily as a close-range defensive measure, it provides protection against patrol boats, floating mines, and various shore-based targets.
The Mk 38 Mod 2 weapons system is a remotely operated Mk 38 with an electronic optical sight, laser range-finder, FLIR, a more reliable feeding system, all of which enhance the weapon systems capabilities and accuracy.
The Phalanx CIWS (pronounced "sea-wiz") is a close-in weapon system for defense against aircraft and anti-ship missiles. it can also be used against a variety of surface targets. Consisting of a radar-guided 20 mm 6-barreled M61 Vulcan cannon mounted on a swiveling base, it is used on the Coast Guard's National Security Cutters. This system can operate autonomously against airborne threats or may be manually operated with the use of electronic optical sight, laser range-finder and FLIR systems against surface targets.
The Sea PROTECTOR MK50 is a remotely controlled gyro-stabilized M2 .50 caliber heavy machine gun. The sight package includes a daylight video camera, a thermal camera and an eye-safe laser rangefinder operated by a joystick. It is also furnished with a fully integrated fire control system that provides ballistic correction.

Small arms and light weapons

The U.S. Coast Guard uses a wide variety of small arms and light weapons. Handguns, shotguns, and rifles are used to arm boat crew and boarding team members and machine guns are mounted aboard cutters, boats, and helicopters.

Small arms and light weapons arms include:
 M9 9mm pistol
 SIG Sauer P229R DAK .40 S&W pistol
 Remington M870P 12 gauge shotgun
 M16A2 rifle
 M4 carbine
 Mk 18 carbine
 M14 Tactical rifle
 Mk 11 (KAC SR-25) 
 Mk 11 Mod 2 precision rifle
 FN M240 machine gun
 M2 .50 caliber heavy machine gun
 Mk 19 40mm grenade launcher
 Barrett M107 .50-caliber rifle, used by marksmen from the Helicopter Interdiction Tactical Squadron and Law Enforcement Detachments to disable the engines on fleeing boats.

Symbols

Core values
The Coast Guard, like the other armed services of the United States, has a set of core values that serve as basic ethical guidelines for all Coast Guard active duty, reservists, auxiliarists, and civilians. The Coast Guard Core Values are:

The Guardian Ethos
In 2008, the Coast Guard introduced the Guardian Ethos. As the Commandant, Admiral Allen noted in a message to all members of the Coast Guard: [The Ethos] "defines the essence of the Coast Guard," and is the "contract the Coast Guard and its members make with the nation and its citizens."

The Coast Guard Ethos
In an ALCOAST message effective 1 December 2011 the Commandant, Admiral Papp, directed that the language of Guardian Ethos be superseded by the Coast Guard Ethos in an effort to use terminology that would help with the identity of personnel serving in the Coast Guard. The term Coast Guardsman is the correct form of address used in Title 14 USC and is the form that has been used historically. This changed the line in the Guardian Ethos "I am a Guardian." to become "I am a Coast Guardsman."

The Ethos is:

Creed of the United States Coast Guardsman

The "Creed of the United States Coast Guardsman" was written by Vice Admiral Harry G. Hamlet, who served as Commandant of the Coast Guard from 1932 to 1936.

"You have to go out, but you don't have to come back!"
This unofficial motto of the Coast Guard dates to an 1899 United States Lifesaving Service regulation, which states in part: "In attempting a rescue, ... he will not desist from his efforts until by actual trial, the impossibility of effecting a rescue is demonstrated. The statement of the keeper that he did not try to use the boat because the sea or surf was too heavy will not be accepted, unless attempts to launch it were actually made and failed."

Coast Guard Ensign

The Coast Guard Ensign (flag) was first flown by the Revenue Cutter Service in 1799 to distinguish revenue cutters from merchant ships. A 1 August 1799 order issued by Secretary of the Treasury Oliver Wolcott Jr. specified that the Ensign would be "sixteen perpendicular stripes (for the number of states in the United States at the time), alternate red and white, the union of the ensign to be the arms of the United States in a dark blue on a white field."

This ensign became familiar in American waters and served as the sign of authority for the Revenue Cutter Service until the early 20th century. The ensign was originally intended to be flown only on revenue cutters and boats connected with the Customs Service but over the years it was found flying atop custom houses as well, and the practice became a requirement in 1874. On 7 June 1910, President William Howard Taft issued an Executive Order adding an emblem to (or "defacing") the ensign flown by the Revenue cutters to distinguish it from what is now called the Customs Ensign flown from the custom houses. The emblem was changed to the official seal of the Coast Guard in 1927.

The purpose of the ensign is to allow ship captains to easily recognize those vessels having legal authority to stop and board them. It is flown only as a symbol of law enforcement authority and is never carried as a parade standard.

Coast Guard Standard

The Coast Guard Standard is used in parades and carries the battle honors of the Coast Guard. It was derived from the jack of the Coast Guard ensign which was flown by revenue cutters. The emblem is a blue eagle from the coat of arms of the United States on a white field. Above the eagle are the words "UNITED STATES COAST GUARD" below the eagle is the motto, "SEMPER PARATUS" and the inscription "1790."

Service Mark ("Racing Stripe")

The Racing Stripe, officially known as the Service Mark, was designed in 1964 by the industrial design office of Raymond Loewy Associates to give the Coast Guard a distinctive, modern image. Loewy had designed the colors for the Air Force One fleet for Jackie Kennedy. President Kennedy was so impressed with his work, he suggested that the entire Federal Government needed his make-over and suggested that he start with the Coast Guard. The stripes are canted at a 64 degree angle, coincidentally the year the Racing Stripe was designed.

The racing stripe is borne by Coast Guard cutters, aircraft, and many boats. First used and placed into official usage as of 6 April 1967, it consists of a narrow blue stripe, a narrow white stripe between, and a broad CG red bar with the Coast Guard shield centered. Red-hulled icebreaker cutters and most HH-65/MH-65 helicopters (i.e., those with a red fuselage) bear a narrow blue stripe, a narrow empty stripe the color of the fuselage (an implied red stripe), and broad white bar, with the Coast Guard shield centered. Conversely, black-hulled cutters (such as buoy tenders and inland construction tenders) use the standard racing stripe. Auxiliary vessels maintained by the Coast Guard also carry the Racing Stripe, but in inverted colors (i.e., broad blue stripe with narrow white and CG red stripes) and the Auxiliary shield. Similar racing stripe designs have been adopted for the use of other coast guards and maritime authorities and many other law enforcement and rescue agencies.

Uniforms

For most of the Coast Guard's history its uniforms largely mirrored the style of U.S. Navy uniforms, distinguishable only by their insignia. In 1974, under the leadership of Admiral Chester R. Bender, the initial versions of the current Coast Guard Service Dress Blue and Tropical uniforms were introduced. This represented a major departure from many common conventions in naval and maritime uniforms. Notably, "Bender's Blues" were a common service dress uniform for all ranks, dispensing with the sailor suit and sailor cap formerly worn by enlisted members. Rank insignia remained consistent with the naval pattern and some distinctly-nautical items such as the pea coat, officer's sword, and dress white uniforms remained.

Today, the Coast Guard's uniforms remain among the simplest of any branch of the armed forces, with fewer total uniforms and uniform variants than the other armed services. There are only three uniforms that typically serve as standard uniforms of the day—the Operational Dress Uniform, Tropical Blue, and Service Dress Blue (Bravo).

Coast Guard Reserve

The United States Coast Guard Reserve is the reserve military force of the Coast Guard. The Coast Guard Reserve was founded on 19 February 1941. The Coast Guard has 8700 reservists who normally drill two days a month and an additional 12 days of active duty each year, although many perform additional drill and active duty periods, to include those mobilized to extended active duty. Coast Guard reservists possess the same training and qualifications as their active duty counterparts, and as such, can be found augmenting active duty Coast Guard units every day.

During the Vietnam War and shortly thereafter, the Coast Guard considered abandoning the reserve program, but the force was instead reoriented into force augmentation, where its principal focus was not just reserve operations, but to add to the readiness and mission execution of every-day active duty personnel.

Since 11 September 2001, reservists have been activated and served on tours of active duty, to include deployments to the Persian Gulf and also as parts of Department of Defense combatant commands such as the U.S. Northern and Central Commands. Coast Guard Port Security Units are entirely staffed with reservists, except for five to seven active duty personnel. Additionally, most of the staffing the Coast Guard provides to the Navy Expeditionary Combat Command are reservists.

The Reserve is managed by the Assistant Commandant for Reserve, Rear Admiral James M. Kelly, USCG.

Women in the Coast Guard

There have been women in the United States Coast Guard since 1918, and women continue to serve in it today.

During World War I, in 1918, twin sisters Genevieve and Lucille Baker transferred from the Naval Coastal Defense Reserve and became the first uniformed women to serve in the Coast Guard.

Coast Guard Auxiliary

The United States Coast Guard Auxiliary is the civilian volunteer uniformed auxiliary service of the United States Coast Guard, created on 23 June 1939 by an act of Congress. Although a civilian organization, it was originally named the "United States Coast Guard Reserve" and was later re-named the "United States Coast Guard Auxiliary" on 19 February 1941 when a military reserve force for the Coast Guard was created. As part of "Team Coast Guard" (the term used to collectively describe all active, reserve, auxiliary, and civilian members/employeees), the Auxiliary carries out, or assists in, nearly all of the Coast Guard's noncombatant and non-law enforcement missions. Auxiliarists are subject to direction from the Commandant of the Coast Guard making them unique among all federal volunteers (e.g. Air Force's Civil Air Patrol and FBI's InfraGard); they are not a separate organization, but an integral part of the Coast Guard. As of 2022, there were approximately 26,000 members of the U.S. Coast Guard Auxiliary.

Coast Guard policy has assigned many of its duties related to recreational boating safety to the Auxiliary, including public boating safety education and outreach.  This includes offering boating skills courses, liaising with marine-related businesses at the local level, and providing voluntary Vessel Safety Checks (formerly called Courtesy Examinations) to the public. Additionally, Auxiliarists use their own vessels, boats, and aircraft (once registered as Coast Guard facilities) to provide operational support to the Coast Guard by conducting safety patrols, assisting in search and rescue missions, inspecting aids to navigation, and performing other tasks on behalf of the Coast Guard.

Prior to 1997, Auxiliarists were largely limited to activities supporting recreational boating safety. In 1997, however, new legislation authorized the Auxiliary to participate in any and all Coast Guard missions except direct military and direct law enforcement. Auxiliarists may directly augment active duty Coast Guard personnel in non-combat, non-law enforcement roles (e.g. radio communications watch stander, interpreter, cook, etc.) and may assist active duty personnel in inspecting commercial vessels and maintaining aids-to-navigation. Auxiliarists may support the law enforcement and homeland security missions of the Coast Guard but may not directly participate (make arrests, etc.), and Auxiliarists are not permitted to carry a weapon while serving in any Auxiliary capacity.

Medals and honors

One Coast Guardsman, Douglas Albert Munro, has earned the Medal of Honor, the highest military award of the United States. Fifty five Coast Guardsmen have earned the Navy Cross and numerous men and women have earned the Distinguished Flying Cross.

The highest peacetime decoration awarded within the Coast Guard is the Homeland Security Distinguished Service Medal; prior to the transfer of the Coast Guard to the Department of Homeland Security, the highest peacetime decoration was the Department of Transportation Distinguished Service Medal. The highest unit award available is the Presidential Unit Citation.

In wartime, members of the Coast Guard are eligible to receive the Navy version of the Medal of Honor. A Coast Guard Medal of Honor is authorized but has not yet been developed or issued.

In May 2006, at the Change of Command ceremony when Admiral Thad Allen took over as Commandant, President George W. Bush awarded the entire Coast Guard, including the Coast Guard Auxiliary, the Coast Guard Presidential Unit Citation with hurricane device, for its efforts during and after Hurricane Katrina and Tropical Storm Rita.

Notable Coast Guardsmen

Numerous celebrities have served in the Coast Guard including tennis player Jack Kramer, golfer Arnold Palmer, All Star baseball player Sid Gordon, boxer Jack Dempsey; musicians Kai Winding, Rudy Vallee, Derroll Adams, and Tom Waits; actors Buddy Ebsen, Sid Caesar, Victor Mature, Richard Cromwell, Alan Hale Jr., William Hopper, Beau Bridges, Jeff Bridges, Cesar Romero; author Alex Haley; and Senator Claiborne Pell.

Vice Admiral Thad Allen in 2005 was named Principal Federal Officer to oversee recovery efforts in the Gulf Region after Hurricane Katrina. After promotion to Admiral, on the eve of his retirement as Commandant, Allen again received national visibility after being named National Incident Commander overseeing the response efforts of the Deepwater Horizon oil spill.

Former Coast Guard officers have been appointed to numerous civilian government offices. After retiring as Commandant of the Coast Guard in 2002, Admiral James Loy went on to serve as United States Deputy Secretary of Homeland Security. After their respective Coast Guard careers, Carlton Skinner served as the first Civilian Governor of Guam; G. William Miller, 65th Secretary of the Treasury, and retired Vice Admiral Harvey E. Johnson Jr. served as Deputy Administrator and Chief Operating Officer of the Federal Emergency Management Agency (FEMA) under President George W. Bush. Rear Admiral Stephen W. Rochon was appointed by President George W. Bush to serve as the Director of the Executive Residence and White House Chief Usher, beginning service on 12 March 2007, and continued to serve in the same capacity under President Barack Obama.

Two Coast Guard aviators, Commander Bruce E. Melnick and Captain Daniel C. Burbank, have served as NASA astronauts.

Signalman First Class Douglas Albert Munro was awarded the Medal of Honor posthumously, and is the only Coast Guardsman to ever receive this honor.

Organizations

Coast Guard Aviation Association
Those who have piloted or flown in Coast Guard aircraft under official flight orders may join the Coast Guard Aviation Association which was formerly known as the "Ancient Order of the Pterodactyl" ("Flying Since the World was Flat"). The Ancient Albatross Award is presented to the active duty USCG member who qualified as an aviator earlier than any other person who is still serving. Separate enlisted and officer awards are given.

Coast Guard CW Operators Association
The Coast Guard CW Operators Association (CGCWOA) is a membership organization comprising primarily former members of the United States Coast Guard who held the enlisted rating of Radioman (RM) or Telecommunications Specialist (TC), and who employed International Morse Code (CW) in their routine communications duties on Coast Guard cutters and at shore stations.

USCG Chief Petty Officers Association
Members of this organization unite to assist members and dependents in need, assist with Coast Guard recruiting efforts, support the aims and goals of the Coast Guard Chief Petty Officers Academy, keep informed on Coast Guard matters, and assemble for social amenities; and include Chief, Senior Chief, and Master Chief Petty Officers, active, reserve and retired. Membership is also open to all Chief Warrant Officers and Officers who have served as a Chief Petty Officer.

USCG Chief Warrant and Warrant Officers Association (CWOA)
Established in 1929, the Chief Warrant and Warrant Officers Association, United States Coast Guard (CWOA) represents Coast Guard warrant and chief warrant officers (active, reserve and retired) to the Congress, White House and the Department of Homeland Security. Additionally, the association communicates with the Coast Guard leadership on matters of concern to Coast Guard chief warrant officers.

In popular culture

The U.S. Coast Guard maintains a Motion Picture and Television Office (MOPIC) in Hollywood, California, along with its sister services at the Department of Defense dedicated to enhancing public awareness and understanding of the Coast Guard, its people, and its missions through a cooperative effort with the entertainment industry.

In film
 Swamp Fire (1946) features the Coast Guard bar pilots in Louisiana.
 Fighting Coast Guard (1951), depicts Coast Guard trained to help win WWII.
 Onionhead (1958), is a comedy drama film set aboard the (fictional) Coast Guard buoy tender USCGC Periwinkle at the start of World War II. The film was shot at Warner Bros.' studio in Burbank, California; location shooting for the film took place at the Coast Guard station in Alameda, California, and aboard USCGC Yamacraw (WARC-333), at Coast Guard Base Yerba Buena Island.
 The Boatniks (1970), is a light-hearted depiction of a Coast Guard unit tasked with supervising recreational boaters on the California coast.
 The Island (1980), latter-day Caribbean pirates capture the (fictional) cutter USCGC New Hope.
 Bad Boys II (2003), depicts counter-drug helicopters from the Helicopter Interdiction Tactical Squadron (HITRON).
 The Guardian (2006), depicts the Aviation Survival Technician (AST) program.
 Pain & Gain (2013), starring Dwayne Johnson and Mark Wahlberg, depicted the Coast Guard Deployable Operations Group in action.
 The Finest Hours (2016), A film portraying the rescue of the crew of SS Pendleton by coxswain Bernard C. Webber and the three other crewmen of Coast Guard Motor Lifeboat CG 36500.
 Deepwater Horizon (2016), depicts the events of 20 April 2010 when the mobile drilling platform Deepwater Horizon suffered a mass casualty explosion that resulted in the deaths of 11 crew members. The film also depicts the Coast Guard's coordination and response in the immediate aftermath of the explosion.

On television
The Coast Guard has been featured in several television series, including:
 Coast Guard was a syndicated television series that aired for three seasons from 1995 to 1997 in the United States as well as overseas, where it was called Sea Rescue. The series followed Coast Guard personnel as they performed their missions.
 Coast Guard Alaska: Search and Rescue, a series on The Weather Channel that features a Coast Guard search-and-rescue unit based in Kodiak, Alaska. Several series have spun off the original to focus on units based in Cape Disappointment and Florida. 
 Deadliest Catch, works extensively with Base Kodiak, who cooperates with the film crew to ensure safety and has been featured in several rescues.
 Doll & Em features an CG ANT team member and the Point Vicente Light as the lighthouse Doll & Em escape to do their writing in the Season 2 opener.
 Hawaii Five-0, features several episodes in which the Five-0 team worked with Station Honolulu and Air Station Barbers Point.
 NCIS, Diane Neal portrays Abigail Borin, CGIS Special Agent in Charge featured in several episodes of both NCIS and NCIS: New Orleans.

See also

U.S. Coast Guard

 AMVER
 Badges of the United States Coast Guard
 Chaplain of the Coast Guard
 Coast Guard Day
 Code of Federal Regulations, Title 33
 Joint Maritime Training Center
 List of United States Coast Guard cutters
 Maritime Law Enforcement Academy
 Maritime Security Risk Analysis Model
 MARSEC
 National Data Buoy Center
 National Ice Center
 Naval militia
 North Pacific Coast Guard Agencies Forum
 Patrol Forces Southwest Asia
 SPARS
 U.S. Coast Guard Intelligence
 U.S. Coast Guard Legal Division
 United States Coast Guard Air Stations
 United States Coast Guard Police
 United States Coast Guard Research & Development Center
 United States Coast Guard Stations
 Women in the United States Coast Guard

Related agencies
 List of United States federal law enforcement agencies
 National Oceanic and Atmospheric Administration Fisheries Office of Law Enforcement
 U.S. Customs and Border Protection (CBP)
 U.S. Immigration and Customs Enforcement (ICE)
 U.S. Maritime Service
 U.S. Merchant Marine

Notes

References

Further reading
 
 Coast Guard: Observations on Progress Made and Challenges Faced in Developing and Implementing a Common Operational Picture: Testimony before the Subcommittee on Coast Guard and Maritime Transportation, Committee on Transportation and Infrastructure, House of Representatives Government Accountability Office

External links

About U.S. Coast Guard
 Coast Guard Magazine
 USCG Proceedings Magazine
 Coast Guard Directives and Publications
 Coast Guard Flags
 USCG Homeport Website
  Women & the U. S. Coast Guard
 
 Coast Guard in the Federal Register
 Reports on the Coast Guard, Department of Homeland Security Office of Inspector General
 A Cooperative Strategy for 21st Century Seapower  
 U.S. Coast Guard Videos
 Military search and social network for current and former members of the Army, Air Force, Navy, Marine Corps, and Coast Guard
 U.S. Coast Guard Auxiliary Website
 Coast Guard Channel 
 Coast Guard News
 Congressional Research Service (CRS) Reports regarding the U.S. Coast Guard CRS Search Results 
 
 US Coast Guard Network Group on LinkedIn
 
 

 
1915 establishments in the United States
Coast guards
Gendarmerie
Organizations based in Washington, D.C.
Sea rescue organizations
Coast Guard
Coast Guard
United States Armed Forces service branches
Marine occupations
Coast Guard